Pultenaea blakelyi, commonly known as Blakely's bush-pea, is a species of flowering plant in the family Fabaceae and is endemic to south-eastern continental Australia. It is an erect shrub with sharply-pointed, narrow elliptic to egg-shaped leaves and yellow to orange flowers in open clusters in leaf axils or at the ends of branches.

Description

Taxonomy and naming
This species was first formally described in 1941 by William Blakely who gave it the name Pultenaea trinervia in Contribution from the new South Wales Herbarium. In 1958, Joy Thompson changed its name to Pultenaea blakelyi in Proceedings of the Linnean Society of New South Wales, distinguishing it from Pultenaea trinervis J.M.Black. The specific epithet (blakelyi) honours Blakely.

Distribution and habitat
Pultenaea blakelyi grows in forest on the coast and tablelands of New South Wales between Myall Lakes and Merimbula but there is also a single record from Traralgon in Victoria.

References

blakelyi
Fabales of Australia
Flora of New South Wales
Flora of Victoria (Australia)
Plants described in 1941
Taxa named by William Blakely